Nahuel Huapi Lake is a lake in the lake region of northern Patagonia between the provinces of Río Negro and Neuquén, in Argentina. The tourist center of Bariloche is on the southern shore of the lake.

The June 2011 eruption of the Puyehue-Cordón Caulle volcanic complex, in neighboring Chile, caused parts of the lake's surface to be blanketed in volcanic ash.

During the Last Glacial Maximum of the Llanquihue glaciation the lake basin was wholly occupied by a glacier.

The lake has usually a blue colour but on occasion its water have turned turquoise or green after earthquakes in southern Chile such as the one on May 22, 1960 and the one on January 2, 2011.

The dominant species of plankton in the wintert half-year in the lake is Dictyosphaerium pulchellum. The remainder of the year Bacillariophyceae and Chrysophyceae algae dominate.

Etymology
The name of the lake derives from the toponym of its major island in Mapudungun (Mapuche language): "Island of Puma", from nahuel, 'puma', and huapí, 'island'. There is, however, more to the word "Nahuel"—it can also signify 'a man who by sorcery has been transformed to a puma'.

Geography

The lake depression consists of several glacial valleys carved out along faults and Miocene valleys that were later dammed by moraines.

Its seven branches are named Blest, Huemul , de la Tristeza, Campanario, Machete, del Rincón and Última Esperanza. It is connected to other smaller lakes such as Gutiérrez, Moreno, Espejo and Correntoso.

A curious fact about the lake is that, despite being nowhere near any ocean and being at high altitude, it is also home for kelp gull and the blue eyed cormorant (Phalacrocorax atriceps), otherwise strictly marine birds.

Hypothermia is one of the risks bathers must undertake. Kayaking is a popular sport on this and adjacent lakes.
The lake is also the starting point of the Limay River.

Fauna
This lake harbors several introduced, non-native species of trout, including rainbow trout, brown trout and brook trout which attract anglers from the world over.

Nahuelito

At the beginning of the 20th century, and following an old aboriginal legend, the rumor of a giant creature living in the deep waters of the lake took up. The creature is known locally as Nahuelito. Reported sightings of it predate Nessie and Arthur Conan Doyle's The Lost World (1912).

Local Mapuche called another creature el Cuero (leather) for its smooth skin.  The neighboring lake Lago Lácar, has also been the site for accounts of another creature, more consistent with a plesiosaur, with aborigines describing it as a sea-cow with teeth all around it.

Members of the Buenos Aires Zoo visited the lake in 1922 trying to corroborate the reports of sightings of the prehistoric animal, but found no evidence to support the theory of such a creature.

Hitler conspiracy theory

Some works, such as the National Police Gazette (circa 1950–1970), an American tabloid-style magazine, as well as a 2004 book by Abel Basti and the 2011 book Grey Wolf claim that Adolf Hitler and Eva Braun did not commit suicide but escaped to Argentina along with other Nazis and lived in the surroundings of Bariloche for many years after World War II, choosing to hide out at the Inalco House at the northwest end of the lake, in part due to the estate's remoteness and lack of accessibility.

The son of real-estate businessman Primo Capraro sold the property to architect Alejandro Bustillo, who designed the house in early 1943. The plan includes bedrooms connected by bathrooms (and closets), similar to Hitler's Berghof residence. Bustillo sold the estate to Enrique García Merou, a Buenos Aires lawyer linked to several German businesses; Merou is alleged to have assisted the Nazi ratlines. The residence was later sold to businessman Jorge Antonio, an associate of Argentine president Juan Perón. In 1970, the house was sold to José Rafael Trozzo, who also bought properties owned by escaped Schutzstaffel (SS) officer Reinhard Kopps, who—along with Capraro—had ties to SS commander Erich Priebke. The Trozzo family put the house up for sale in 2011 (the year Grey Wolf was released). 

According to the fringe theory, a number of U-boats took certain Nazis and Nazi loot to Argentina, where the Nazis were supported by Perón, who, with his wife Evita, had been receiving money from the Nazis for some time. Hitler allegedly arrived in Argentina, first staying at Hacienda San Ramón, east of San Carlos de Bariloche. Hitler then moved to a Bavarian-style mansion at Inalco. Purportedly, Eva Braun left Hitler around 1954 and moved to Neuquén with their daughter, Ursula ('Uschi'), and Hitler died in February 1962.

Citing a former Nazi presence in Bariloche, the investigative series Hunting Hitler (2015–2018) reveals a guard tower—reportedly built by the same architect as the Inalco House—looking over the lake (situated closer to Bariloche than the house), as well as a destroyed bunker on the other side of the lake; together the two sites (in addition to other possible lookouts such as a wooden building resembling a guard shack) may have provided a panoramic view used to safeguard the mansion, accessible from only the lake due to heavy forestation and long rumoured to have housed Hitler. Additionally, the Hunting Hitler team cited the proximity of German scientist Ronald Richter's Perón-backed nuclear fusion project on Huemul Island.

In a 2018 episode of Expedition Unknown, Abel Basti secured a rare excursion into the Inalco House, revealing little except for some old kitchen utensils in the basement. Using a metal detector on the grounds, host Josh Gates located a Nazi coin, leading him to conclude that Nazis (but not necessarily Hitler) could have used the house.

Gallery

See also
 Limay River, a major river of the region that runs from the lake

References

External links
World Lake's Database
Photograph from orbit from NASA's STS-88 space shuttle mission
Nahuel Huapi Fauna
Blue Eyed Cormorant
Bariloche Tourism
Reevaluation of Cheek Patterns of Juvenal-Plumaged Blue-Eyed and King Shags
Nahuelito, Patagonian Lake Monster
 Satellite image of the Nahuel Huapi lake(2369x2328 pixels)

Nahuel Huapi
Lakes of Río Negro Province
Lakes of Neuquén Province
Glacial lakes of Argentina
Nahuel Huapi National Park